Pålsboda is a locality situated in Hallsberg Municipality, Örebro County, Sweden with 1,552 inhabitants in 2010.

Pålsboda has one school, Folkasboskolan, one care centre, a couple of kindergartens, one ICA convenience store and two pizzerias.
Pålsboda is also known for its Volkswagen museum with a full collection of VW Beetles, from the first ever produced to the last produced. It has the only drawing pin factory in northern Europe, supplying almost all the Scandinavian countries. Pålsboda is also the home of the company Rolf Larsson Mek. AB which has created the whole production line for the "Bingolotto" lottery tickets.

Riksdag elections

References 

Populated places in Örebro County
Populated places in Hallsberg Municipality